Rafael González Rodríguez (born 13 February 1997), commonly known as Chuma, is a Spanish footballer who plays for Atlético Levante UD as a forward.

Club career
Chuma was born in Seville, Andalusia, and was a Sevilla FC youth graduate. He made his senior debut with the C-team on 3 May 2015, starting in a 2–1 Tercera División away win against Arcos CF, and scored his first goals seven days later by netting a brace in a 3–0 home defeat of CD Mairena.

On 27 July 2017, Chuma signed for UB Lebrijana also in the fourth division. He made his debut for the club on 27 August, starting and scoring a hat-trick in a 4–3 win at CD Gerena.

On 31 January 2018, after scoring 13 goals in only 20 appearances, Chuma joined Córdoba CF and was assigned to the reserves in Segunda División B. The transfer was declared void two days later, but it was later authorized by the RFEF.

Chuma made his professional debut on 12 May 2019, coming on as a late substitute for Federico Piovaccari in a 0–1 Segunda División away loss against UD Las Palmas, which ensured his team's relegation. On 18 July, he agreed to a two-year contract with Levante UD, being initially assigned to the reserves in division three.

References

External links

1997 births
Living people
Spanish footballers
Footballers from Seville
Association football forwards
Segunda División players
Segunda División B players
Tercera División players
Sevilla FC C players
Córdoba CF B players
Córdoba CF players
Atlético Levante UD players